Kevin Burke is an American football coach and former player. He served as the head football coach at Juniata College in Huntingdon, Pennsylvania from 1998 to 2003 and at his alma mater, Gettysburg College in Gettysburg, Pennsylvania, from 2018 to 2019.

Head coaching record

References

External links
 Gettysburg profile

Year of birth missing (living people)
Living people
American football wide receivers
Gettysburg Bullets football players
Gettysburg Bullets football coaches
Hamilton Continentals football coaches
Juniata Eagles football coaches
Norwich Cadets football coaches
Stony Brook Seawolves football coaches
Stony Brook University alumni